Hubert Schulze-Pellengahr (August 15, 1899 – June 6, 1985) was a German politician of the Christian Democratic Union (CDU) and former member of the German Bundestag.

Life 
From 1949 to 1961 he was a member of the German Bundestag, where he represented the constituency of Lüdinghausen - Coesfeld as a directly elected member of parliament.

Literature

References

1899 births
1985 deaths
Members of the Bundestag for North Rhine-Westphalia
Members of the Bundestag 1957–1961
Members of the Bundestag 1953–1957
Members of the Bundestag 1949–1953
Members of the Bundestag for the Christian Democratic Union of Germany